 

Otto Schmidt-Hartung (9 February 1892 – 19 February 1976) was a German general in the Wehrmacht of Nazi Germany during World War II.

Awards and decorations

 Knight's Cross of the Iron Cross on 29 Juni 1940 as Oberst and commander of Infanterie-Regiment 35

References

Citations

Bibliography

 

1892 births
1976 deaths
People from Weinheim
People from the Grand Duchy of Baden
Lieutenant generals of the German Army (Wehrmacht)
German Army personnel of World War I
Recipients of the clasp to the Iron Cross, 1st class
Recipients of the Knight's Cross of the Iron Cross
Military personnel from Baden-Württemberg
German Army generals of World War II